Kent Beck (born 1961) is an American software engineer and the creator of extreme programming, a software development methodology that eschews rigid formal specification for a collaborative and iterative design process. Beck was one of the 17 original signatories of the Agile Manifesto, the founding document for agile software development. Extreme and Agile methods are closely associated with Test-Driven Development (TDD), of which Beck is perhaps the leading proponent.

Beck pioneered software design patterns, as well as the commercial application of Smalltalk. He wrote the SUnit unit testing framework for Smalltalk, which spawned the xUnit series of frameworks, notably JUnit for Java, which Beck wrote with Erich Gamma. Beck popularized CRC cards with Ward Cunningham, the inventor of the wiki.

He lives in San Francisco, California and worked at social media company Facebook. In 2019, Beck joined Gusto as a software fellow and coach, where he coaches engineering teams as they build out payroll systems for small businesses.

History 
Beck attended the University of Oregon between 1979 and 1987, receiving B.S. and M.S. degrees in computer and information science.

In 1996 Beck was hired to work on the Chrysler Comprehensive Compensation System. Beck in turn brought in Ron Jeffries. In March 1996 the development team estimated the system would be ready to go into production around one year later.  In 1997 the development team adopted a way of working which is now formalized as extreme programming. The one-year delivery target was nearly achieved, with actual delivery being only a couple of months late.

Publications

Books 
 1996. Kent Beck's Guide to Better Smalltalk : A Sorted Collection. Cambridge University Press.
 1997. Smalltalk Best Practice Patterns. Prentice Hall. 
 2000. Extreme Programming Explained: Embrace Change. Addison-Wesley. Winner of the Jolt Productivity Award.
 2000. Planning Extreme Programming. With Martin Fowler. Addison-Wesley.
 2002. Test-Driven Development by Example. Addison-Wesley.  Winner of the Jolt Productivity Award.
 Beck's concept of test-driven development centers on two basic rules:
 Never write a single line of code unless you have a failing automated test.
 Eliminate duplication.
The book illustrates the use of unit testing as part of the methodology, including examples in Java and Python. One section includes using test-driven development to develop a unit testing framework.
 2003. Contributing to Eclipse: Principles, Patterns, and Plugins. With Erich Gamma. Addison-Wesley.
 2004. JUnit Pocket Guide. O'Reilly.
 2004. Extreme Programming Explained: Embrace Change, 2nd Edition. With Cynthia Andres. Addison-Wesley. Completely rewritten.
 2008. Implementation Patterns. Addison-Wesley. 

Selected papers 
 1987. "Using Pattern Languages for Object-Oriented Programs". With Ward Cunningham. OOPSLA'87.
 1989. "A Laboratory For Teaching Object-Oriented Thinking". With Ward Cunningham. OOPSLA'89.
 1989. "Simple Smalltalk Testing: With Patterns". SUnit framework, origin of xUnit frameworks.

References

External links

 KentBeck on the WikiWikiWeb
 Sample chapter of Kent's book, IMPLEMENTATION PATTERNS
 TalkWare Podcast interview with Kent Beck
 FLOSS Weekly interview with Kent Beck
 Kent Beck's Notes at Facebook
 Kent Beck on unit testing
Being Human Podcast - A conversation with Kent Beck
Kent Beck website

Extreme programming
American technology writers
University of Oregon College of Arts and Sciences alumni
1961 births
Living people
American software engineers
Facebook employees
Software testing people
Tektronix people
Engineers from Oregon
Agile software development